The Weapons and armour of Middle-earth are all those mentioned J. R. R. Tolkien's Middle-earth fantasy writings, such as The Hobbit, The Lord of the Rings and The Silmarillion.

Tolkien modelled his fictional warfare on the Ancient and Early Medieval periods of history. His depiction of weapons and armour particularly reflect Northern European culture as seen in Beowulf and the Norse sagas. Tolkien established this relationship in The Fall of Gondolin, the first story in his legendarium to be written. In this story, the Elves of Gondolin use the mail armour, swords, shields, spears, axes and bows of Northern European warfare. In Tolkien's writings, such Medieval weapons and armour are used by his fictional races, including Elves, Dwarves, Men, Hobbits, and Orcs.

As in his sources, Tolkien's characters often gave names to their weapons, sometimes with runic inscriptions to show they are magical and have their own history and power.

Terminology

Tolkien devised several constructed languages with terms for types of weapons.

 Sword: Noldorin Sindarin: magl, magol, North Sindarin magor, Quenya: makil, macil, Noldorin Sindarin: crist.
 Dagger, knife: Noldorin Sindarin: sigil, Quenya: cirma, sicil
 Axe: North Sindarin: hathol, Quenya: pelekko (Hooker notes the similarity of the Greek πέλεκυς pélekys: double-headed axe), Khuzdul:  bark, pl. baruk
 Spear: Quenya: hatal also nehte
 Bow: Noldorin Sindarin: peng also poetically cû ("arch"), Quenya: quinga.
 Arrow: Quenya: pilin, pl. pilindi (Hooker notes the similarity of the Latin pīlum [javelin, throwing spear], with cognates in the Old High German [pfīl, meaning arrow], Modern German [Pfeil], Old English [pīl], late Old Norse [píla], and the Dutch [pijl].)

Tolkien devised terms for specific types of weapons, such as lango (broad sword), eket, ecet (short sword), and lhang (cutlass, sword).

Types

Swords

Swords symbolized physical prowess in battle for Tolkien, following Northern European culture. Tolkien writes that Elves and Dwarves produced the best swords (and other war gear) and that Elvish swords glowed blue in the presence of Orcs. Elves generally used straight swords while Orcs generally used curved swords. Both races have exceptions: Egalmoth of Gondolin used a curved sword and the Uruk-hai of Isengard used short, broad blades. Tolkien often mentions the use of shields together with one-handed swords.

Knives

Knives are mentioned in Tolkien's works, sometimes as backup weapons—such as the unnamed long knife of Legolas the archer. However, some individual knives are given more significance through naming (e.g. Sting, see below). Weapons that were only knives or short swords for adult Men or Elves could function as formidable swords in the hands of Hobbits, a diminutive people.

In "The Scouring of the Shire", Saruman attempts to stab Frodo with a knife, but is foiled by the mithril shirt worn under his jacket. Shortly afterwards Saruman's throat was fatally cut with a knife borne by Wormtongue.

For The Lord of the Rings film trilogy, Legolas possessed twin fighting knives carried in sheaths near his quiver.

Special unnamed knives

There are some knives in Tolkien's fiction which do not have formal names, but nevertheless play important roles in the plot.

Morgul-blades

The Witch-king of Angmar, leader of the Nazgûl, used a magical dagger called a "Morgul-blade" to wound Frodo Baggins at Weathertop. The dark magic of the knife gravely affects Frodo's well-being, threatening to turn him into a wraith, especially because its detachable point migrated in Frodo's body for more than two weeks before it could be extracted, thus causing great damage. Recurring ill effects from the wound contribute to Frodo's eventual departure to Valinor. According to the J.R.R. Tolkien Encyclopedia, the weapon may owe something to the tradition of the "elf-shot" found in Old English medical texts and charms, where it denotes illnesses of presumed supernatural origin.

Barrow-blades

Tom Bombadil recovers four magical daggers, forged by the Men of Westernesse to fight the powers of Angmar, from a tomb guarded by the Barrow-wight. He gives them to Frodo Baggins and his Hobbit companions, for whom the daggers are effectively swords. One of these "Barrow-blades" – that given to Merry Brandybuck – proves instrumental in bringing about the death of the Witch-king.

The daggers had varying fates in The Lord of the Rings. When the Nazgûl attacked Aragorn and the hobbits on Weathertop, Frodo slashed at one of them with his dagger but only damaged its cloak. He broke the blade when he fell from a horse, and left it behind in Rivendell, taking Bilbo's sword Sting instead. Sam Gamgee left his beside Frodo in Cirith Ungol and later had it returned to him by Gandalf. Pippin Took made use of his dagger in the Battle of the Black Gate to slay a Troll-chief. Merry's blade is destroyed during his attack on the Witch-king.

Axes

Battle axes are especially favoured by Dwarves in Tolkien's writings; Gimli uses the battle cry: Axes of the Dwarves! The Dwarves are upon you! (Khuzdul: Baruk Khazâd! Khazâd ai-mênu!). For The Lord of the Rings film trilogy, Gimli the Dwarf was assigned various axes of different makes during the course of the films.

The use of battle axes in other races tended to be more exceptional. The Sindarin Elves of Doriath favoured axes as weapons during the First Age. Other notable axe-bearers were Tuor (the wielder of Dramborleg), the Men of the White Mountains who marched to the defence of Minas Tirith in The Lord of the Rings movie (replacing the axe-wielding men of Lossarnach from the book) and a contingent of Easterlings among the besiegers of Minas Tirith.

Bows and arrows

Bows of different sizes and construction are featured in Tolkien's works. Elves of Lothlórien, Men, and Uruk-hai used longbows, while Elves of Mirkwood and Orcs of Mordor used smaller ones. These bows are said to be made of wood, horn and even steel.

The most famous bowman in Tolkien's stories of the First Age of Middle-earth is the Elf Beleg; his bow was named Belthronding, and his arrow Dailir. Infamously Curufin, a lord of the Noldor, attempts to shoot the Elf-princess Lúthien with the bow of his brother Celegorm. His first arrow is intercepted by Huan; Beren attempts to intercept the second shot, and is wounded.

In The Lord of the Rings, set in the late Third Age, a bow is the main weapon of Legolas, the Elf-member of the Fellowship of the Ring. When the Fellowship meet Galadriel, she gives Legolas a new bow. He later uses it to shoot all the way across the great river Anduin and bring down an airborne Nazgûl.

The Lord of the Rings film trilogy assigns a bow to Aragorn and crossbows to the Uruk-hai. However, in Tolkien's writings Aragorn is armed only with the sword Andúril (below), and crossbows are only mentioned in connection to hunting by Númenoreans in their lost homeland of Númenor. 

Sometimes individual arrows are given special mention in Tolkien's works. In The Hobbit, the Black Arrow was a royal heirloom used by Bard the Bowman to kill the dragon Smaug. In The Lord of the Rings, the Red Arrow was a token used by Gondor to summon its allies in time of need. In the  Lord of the Rings film trilogy, the Red Arrow is omitted and its role is conflated with the Beacons of Gondor.

Hobbits "shot well with the bow". The Shire sent archers to the battles of the Fall of Arnor.

Armour

Body armour in Tolkien's fiction is mainly in the form of mail or scale shirts, in keeping with Ancient and Early Medieval periods of history. In contrast, the Lord of the Rings film trilogy features later medieval plate armour suits. These kinds of plate armour are not found in Tolkien's writings, but plate does appear in the form of individual pieces such as vambraces (forearm guards) or greaves (leg and shin guards). As with other items of war, Elves and Dwarves produced the best armour. The mail shirt forged by Dwarves from the fictional metal mithril appears in The Hobbit and The Lord of the Rings, worn in turn by the protagonists Bilbo and Frodo Baggins.

In Letter 211 of The Letters of J.R.R. Tolkien, the author compared the war-gear of the Rohirrim to the Bayeux Tapestry, made during the Norman Conquest of Anglo-Saxon England.

Helmets

Battle helmets are commonly used by virtually all races in Tolkien's writings. The Rohirrim were partly modelled on the Anglo-Saxons, who wore elaborate helmets; Éomer's helmet had a long white horse-tail. The Crown of Gondor was a jewelled battle-helmet; Aragorn received it at his coronation. Frodo Baggins and Sam Gamgee use Orc-helmets as part of their disguise in Mordor.

In the First Age, Dwarves made dragon-helms, which were said to protect against Dragons. The most famous of these was the Dragon-helm of Dor-lómin.

The Second Age was dominated by Númenor. The Númenórean helmet, the karma, reached particularly elaborate forms. Those of the Uinendili, a guild of mariners, were "made of overlapping plates of metal, the 'fish-crest' of leather embossed and coloured". Tolkien's coloured drawing of the karma of a Uinendili captain features on the cover of Unfinished Tales.

Named items

Tolkien emulated his Northern European mythological and literary sources in having his characters give names to their weapons, marking these out as important aspects of character and sometimes as ancient heirlooms. Named weapons in Medieval literature include Hrunting and Nægling in Beowulf, Tyrfing in the Elder Edda and Gram in the Völsunga saga. The items illustrate the passage of time and the transfer of power or fate to their future bearers.

Named swords and knives

Anglachel

Anglachel (Sindarin: Iron of the Flaming Star) was a sword forged of meteoritic iron by Eöl the Dark Elf, given to Thingol King of Doriath as a fee for leave to dwell in Nan Elmoth. It could cleave all earth-delved iron. Later wielded by Beleg Strongbow and ultimately Túrin; Anglachel was reforged and renamed Gurthang (Sindarin: Iron of Death). Túrin used Gurthang to kill Glaurung, the Father of Dragons, and later used the sword to take his own life in recompense for the accidental slaying of Beleg and the unjust slaying of Brandir. The stories endow the sword with a personality; Melian the Maia perceived malice in it as it was given to Beleg Cúthalion, and the elf Gwindor observed that Anglachel (so named then) seemed to mourn the death of Beleg at the hand of his friend Túrin by Anglachel itself. Túrin asked the sword whether it would slay him swiftly if he cast himself on its point, and it responded at length (the only instance of Gurthang speaking with voice). The depiction of the sword was influenced by that of the sword of the Finnish character Kullervo in the Kalevala.

Angrist

Angrist (Sindarin: Iron-cleaver) was a knife made by the great weaponsmith Telchar of Nogrod, and borne by Curufin. Beren, who had taken it from Curufin, used it to cut a magical Silmaril jewel out of Morgoth's Iron Crown; as Beren attempted to remove another, the knife snapped. In the earliest version of Beren's story in The Book of Lost Tales, he uses an ordinary household knife; the element of Curufin's involvement in Beren's affairs came later.

Anguirel

Anguirel (Sindarin: Iron of Eternity) is the sword forged by Eöl the Dark Elf, similar to Anglachel which was given to Thingol of Doriath in The Silmarillion.  It was the mate of Anglachel, was made of the same meteoritic iron, and had the same physical properties and capabilities as Anglachel, but there is no evidence of sentience in Anguirel.  Anguirel was kept by Eöl until it was stolen by his son, Maeglin.

Aranrúth

Aranrúth (Sindarin: King's Ire) is the sword wielded by King Thingol of Doriath in The Silmarillion. Later the sword of the Kings of Númenor.

Glamdring

Glamdring (Sindarin: Foe-hammer) is a sword in The Hobbit, The Lord of the Rings and Unfinished Tales forged in the First Age by the High Elves of the hidden city of Gondolin. It belonged first to Turgon, the King of Gondolin. It was the mate of Orcrist, and like Orcrist would glow blue whenever orcs were nearby. Glamdring was nicknamed "Beater" by the goblins of the Misty Mountains.

Gurthang
See Anglachel

Gúthwinë

Gúthwinë (Old English: gúð-wine Battle Friend) is the sword wielded by Éomer, third marshal of the Riddermark in The Lord of the Rings. The name is found in the Old English poem Beowulf, where the hero uses the word as an epithet for the sword Hrunting, lent to him by Hrothgar's thane Unferth for the fight with Grendel's mother.

Hadhafang

Hadhafang is the sword invented for Peter Jackson's The Lord of the Rings film trilogy, where it was wielded by Arwen, although she is never actually seen using it in combat, as the blade's design was for main use on horseback, and footage of Arwen at Helm's Deep was ultimately cut. The name is derived from Tolkien's etymological word list written in the 1930s; here Tolkien provides the word hadhathang (dissimilated: havathang, hadhafang), which he translates as "throng-cleaver", though he never used this name in his writings. Hadhafang is wielded by Arwen's father Elrond in The Hobbit film trilogy.

Herugrim

Herugrim (Old English: Fierce Sword) is the sword that belonged to Théoden.

Narsil / Andúril

Narsil (Quenya: roughly, Red and White Flame) is a sword in The Lord of the Rings and The Silmarillion, influenced by the legendary Arthurian sword Excalibur and by Sigurd's sword Gram, as described in the Old Norse Völsunga saga.

The sword was forged during the First Age by the Dwarf Telchar of Nogrod, a famous weaponsmith and artificer who also made the knife Angrist (which cut a Silmaril from the crown of Morgoth) and the Helm of Hador (later used by Túrin Turambar). By the end of the Second Age Narsil was borne by Elendil; during the Last Alliance of Elves and Men it was broken in two pieces in the war against Sauron. Isildur used the hilt-shard to cut the One Ring from Sauron's hand. The two shards, acquiring the additional name the Sword that was Broken, remained an heirloom of Isildur's heirs throughout the Third Age, and were thus inherited by Aragorn. Elvish smiths re-forged the sword for Aragorn before the Fellowship of the Ring began their quest and he renamed it  Andúril (Quenya: Flame of the West).

The reforged Andúril is described as very bright, shining red and white with the light of the sun and moon.  The Silmarillion further states that the original Narsil already shone in such a manner, but its light was extinguished after it was broken. However, for the Lord of the Rings film trilogy, the filmmakers opted not to make Narsil and Andúril glow, keeping that property only for Sting. (Gandalf's sword Glamdring also did not glow in the presence of orcs. Peter Jackson notes, in his DVD commentary on The Fellowship of the Ring, that this was an oversight, not a deliberate change from the books.)

Tolkien writes that when Narsil was reforged, the blade had "a device of seven stars set between the crescent Moon and the rayed Sun, and about them was written many runes". The filmmakers had Anduril made with runes engraved on the blade of the sword that read as "Anar Nányë Andúril i né Narsil i macil Elendilo. Lercuvanten i móli Mordórëo. Isil" (Quenya. 'Sun. I am Andúril who once was Narsil, sword of Elendil. The slaves of Mordor shall flee from me. Moon.'), and another inscription on the hilt Narsil essenya, macil meletya; Telchar carnéron Návarotesse (Quenya: "Narsil is my name, a mighty sword; Telchar made me in Nogrod").

Christopher Tolkien suggested that Narsil was introduced during the writing of The Lord of the Rings rather spontaneously: "It is possible that the Sword that was Broken actually emerged from the verse 'All that is gold does not glitter': on this view, in the earliest form of the verse ... the words a king may yet be without crown, A blade that was broken be brandished were no more than a further exemplification of the general moral [that not everything is what it appears to be]." Following this, references to the sword were introduced during major recastings of "At the Sign of the Prancing Pony" and "The Council of Elrond" chapters.
Originally the sword was only called "the Sword of Elendil" or "the Broken Sword"; later the name Branding (from Old English brand, "sword") was devised for the Sword Reforged.

Orcrist

Orcrist (Sindarin: Goblin-cleaver), a sword in The Hobbit. was originally forged in Gondolin and was nicknamed "Biter" by the goblins of the Misty Mountains. After finding it in a troll-hoard, Thorin Oakenshield carries the sword through the Misty Mountains and Mirkwood before being taken prisoner by the Elves; it was laid on his tomb after his death in the Battle of Five Armies. It is the mate of Glamdring.

Ringil

Ringil (Sindarin: Cold-Star / Cold-Spark) is a sword wielded by Fingolfin in The Silmarillion and The Lays of Beleriand. It bit with chilling cold, and glittered like ice with a pale light. This was the sword with which Fingolfin wounded Morgoth seven times, causing the first dark lord to limp forever afterward.

In Tolkien's early writings, Ringil was the name of one of the two pillars supporting the Two Lamps of primeval Middle-earth.

Sting

Sting is a large Elvish dagger in The Hobbit and The Lord of the Rings. It functioned well as a sword for the hobbits Bilbo and Frodo Baggins.  Bilbo named the weapon after using it to fend off the giant spiders in Mirkwood forest, then later passed it on to Frodo to use in his quest to destroy the One Ring.

Sting glows blue when orcs are nearby, as in Moria.

In Europe, bilbo blades were exceptionally fine swords, named after the city of Bilbao which made them. It is possible that Tolkien connected Bilbo's name and his acquisition of this weapon.

In Peter Jackson's The Lord of the Rings and The Hobbit film adaptations, Sting is depicted as leaf-shaped, with gentle curving edges. Engraved on the blade and cross-guard are letters in Sindarin that read phonetically, Maegnas aen estar nin dagnir in yngyl im. Translated into English, they read, "Maegnas is my name, I am the spider's bane." According to the Appendix of The Silmarillion, the element maeg in Sindarin means "sharp" or "piercing". Its scabbard is made of brown leather and reinforced with metal. In Tolkien's The Hobbit, Sting does not bear an inscription.

Named bows and arrows

Belthronding

Belthronding (Sindarin/Ilkorin: Intractable Bow) is the bow wielded by Beleg Cúthalion (Strongbow) in The Silmarillion and The Lays of Beleriand.

Black Arrow

The Black Arrow was used in Esgaroth by Bard the Bowman; he mentions that it has been used many times, always successfully, and always recovered. An heirloom from many generations of Bard's family, that he believed had been made in the forges of the King under the Mountain; Bard recites its history, urges it to "go now and speed well", and shoots Smaug. The arrow was lost with the Dragon's corpse in the Long Lake.

Dailir

Dailir is the arrow favoured by Beleg, the great bowman of the First Age of Middle-earth. Beleg was always able to retrieve this arrow for reuse.

Red Arrow

The Red Arrow is a black-feathered arrow barbed with steel; its tip was painted red. It was a token used by Gondor to summon Rohan in time of dire need. In The Return of the King, the Red Arrow was presented to Théoden by Hirgon with the message: "...the Lord Denethor asks for all your strength and all your speed, lest Gondor should fall at last." Théoden pledged his assistance, but Hirgon was killed during the ride back to Minas Tirith, leading Denethor to believe that no help was forthcoming from Rohan. The Red Arrow has a historical antecedent in the Old English poem Elene in which Constantine the Great summoned an army of mounted Visigoths to his aid against the Huns by sending an arrow as a "token of war".

Other named weapons and armour

Aeglos

Aeglos (Sindarin: Snow Point, i.e. icicle; also spelled Aiglos) is the spear wielded by the Elf-King Gil-galad; Aiglos is also the name of a type of plant in Middle-earth which most notably grew on Amon Rûdh. Aeglos is also the name of a Tolkienist semiannual almanac published by the Polish Silesian Science-Fiction Club, parent organisation of the Polish Tolkien Society.

Dragon-helm of Dor-lómin

The Dragon-helm of Dor-lómin, also called the Helm of Hador, is the fabulous helmet of the lords of the House of Hador, including Húrin and Túrin. The helm was made of heavy steel, decorated with gold and runes; a gold likeness of Glaurung the Dragon was set upon its crest. It was made for the Dwarf-king Azaghâl by Telchar, the great Dwarf-craftsman of Nogrod. Azaghâl ruled the neighbouring city of Belegost; he gave it to Maedhros, who gave it to Fingon. Fingon then gave it to Hador, along with the lordship of Dor-lómin.

Dramborleg

Dramborleg (Sindarin: Thudder-Sharp) is the axe belonging to Tuor, son of Huor in The Book of Lost Tales and Unfinished Tales.

Durin's Axe

Durin's Axe was part of the regalia and weaponry of the Dwarf-kings of Khazad-dûm.  Some years before the War of the Ring, Balin attempted to recolonize Khazad-dûm (by then called Moria), and the early records of the colony mention Durin's Axe, indicating it was sought for or even found.

Grond

Grond (Sindarin: Club) is the mace of Morgoth used against Fingolfin in The Silmarillion as well as a battering ram in The Lord of the Rings, used to assault the Great Gate of Minas Tirith. Grond the battering ram was in-universe named after Morgoth's mace: "Grond they named it, in memory of the Hammer of the Underworld of old." In the Rankin-Bass adaptation of The Return of the King, the ram Grond is called "the arm of the devil" and "the hammer of the underworld".

Film prop construction 

In The Lord of the Rings film trilogy, "hero" weapons, used for "beauty" shots such as close-ups, were made from high-quality materials: sword blades from heat-treated spring steel; sword hilts from cast bronze or forged and ground steel. "Stunt" swords, used in combat scenes, were made with soft aluminium blades and urethane grips. "Extras" swords were cast entirely from urethane, in one piece. Bows were made of urethane with an inner armature of spring steel. Legolas's arrows were all-digital, so the actor simply mimed shooting each arrow.

References

Primary 
 This list identifies each item's location in Tolkien's writings.

Secondary

Sources 

 
 
  
 
 
 
 
 
 
       
     
       
     
     
       
     
    
     
     
  
       
 
 

Weapons
Middle-earth weapons